Kaminieli Rasaku (born 12 July 1999) is a Fijian rugby sevens player. He won a silver medal with the Fiji sevens team at the 2022 Commonwealth Games in Birmingham. He later won a gold medal at the 2022 Rugby World Cup Sevens in Cape Town.

References 

1999 births
Living people
Male rugby sevens players
Fiji international rugby sevens players
Commonwealth Games medallists in rugby sevens
Commonwealth Games silver medallists for Fiji
Rugby sevens players at the 2022 Commonwealth Games
Medallists at the 2022 Commonwealth Games